Friday Download may refer to:

Friday Download, popular series on produced by Saltbeef Productions on CBBC
List of Friday Download presenters
List of Friday Download episodes
Friday Download: The Movie, released theatrically as Up All Night, 2015 British comedy film directed by John Henderson based on Friday Download